The 2014 Distal & ITR Group Tennis Cup and the Astra Italy Tennis Cup were professional tennis tournaments played on clay courts. It was the 8th edition of the men's tournament which was part of the 2014 ATP Challenger Tour, offering a total of €35,000+H in prize money, and fifth edition of the women's tournament, which was part of the 2014 ITF Women's Circuit, offering a total of $10,000 in prize money. The two events took place together at the Tennis Club Todi in Todi, Italy, on 30 June – 6 July 2014.

Men's singles entrants

Seeds 

 1 Rankings as of 23 June 2014

Other entrants 
The following players received wildcards into the singles main draw:
  Alessandro Giannessi
  Roberto Marcora
  Antonio Massara
  Stefano Travaglia

The following players received entry from the qualifying draw:
  Matteo Donati
  Guillermo Durán
  Maximilian Neuchrist
  Renzo Olivo

Women's singles entrants

Seeds 

 1 Rankings as of 23 June 2014

Other entrants 
The following players received wildcards into the singles main draw:
  Zoe Adeline Katz
  Tatiana Pieri
  Beatrice Torelli
  Madison Westby

The following players received entry from the qualifying draw:
  Camila Aguirri
  Lisa Bastianello
  Martina Caciotti
  Laura Gulbe
  Beatrice Lombardo
  Sri Vaishnavi Peddi Reddy
  Jelena Simić
  Anna Turati

The following player received entry as a lucky loser:
  Alessandra Gisonna

Champions

Men's singles 

  Aljaž Bedene def.  Márton Fucsovics 2–6, 7–6(7–4), 6–4

Women's singles 

  Alice Savoretti def.  Lauren Embree 6–3, 6–3

Men's doubles 

  Guillermo Durán /  Máximo González def.  Riccardo Ghedin /  Claudio Grassi 6–1, 3–6, [10–7]

Women's doubles 

  Deborah Chiesa /  Beatrice Lombardo def.  Federica Di Sarra /  Alice Savoretti 6–3, 3–6, [10–8]

External links 
 Official website 

2014 ATP Challenger Tour
Astra Italy Tennis Cup
2014
2014 in Italian tennis